Seaway is a Canadian rock band from Oakville, Ontario signed to Pure Noise Records and Dine Alone Records. The band has released three EPs and four studio albums.

History

Formation and early releases (2011–2013)
Seaway formed in 2011 in Oakville, Ontario, consisting of Ryan Locke on lead vocals, Patrick Carleton on rhythm guitar and vocals, Andrew Eichinger on lead guitar, Adam Shoji on bass, and Ken Taylor on drums. All of the members have been friends since high school. Locke, Eichinger, and Taylor began playing music together as early as grade 5, performing at talent shows and for other friends. Seaway was originally a side-project of hardcore band The Fellowship, which featured Locke on drums, Eichinger on guitar and Taylor on vocals.

The band released their debut full-length record Hoser in 2013 through Mutant League Records. They began to tour, supporting Major League in February and March 2014. Seaway went on a co-headlining Summer 2014 tour with Stickup Kid, with support from Driver Friendly, from early July to late August.

Pure Noise Records (2014–2017)
In July 2014, Seaway signed to Pure Noise Records. In September, the band performed at Riot Fest. In October, the group supported Bayside on their headlining US tour. On November 4, Seaway released and released their debut EP "All In My Head" featuring the singles "Your Best Friend" and "Alberta." In November, they supported Four Year Strong on their headlining US tour. The band went on to tour heavily in 2015. Seaway supported Neck Deep on The Intercontinental Championships tour in the United Kingdom throughout January and February. In March, the band went on to support Bayside on their 15th anniversary tour through the United States. The group joined As It Is and This Wild Life in the United Kingdom once again in May, as a support act, and performed both at Slam Dunk Festival (UK) and Warped Tour. On August 19, Seaway released a music video for the first single of their sophomore record Colour Blind, directly by YEAH! Films and featuring footage from the band's high school years.

On September 23, 2015, a second single titled "Airhead" was made available for streaming. Colour Blind, Seaway's first full length album on Pure Noise records was released on October 23 Three days later, a music video for the single "Best Mistake" was released. The band toured the U.S. in October and November, supporting Knuckle Puck with support from Head North and Sorority Noise.

In March/April 2016, Seaway joined Knuckle Puck on a UK/Europe tour with additional support from Boston Manor. On April 5, the band released a music video for "Stubborn Love". The band then toured as part of the Pure Noise Tour 2016, as direct support to Hit the Lights. Seaway began their first Canadian headliner in July 2016, with support from Rarity and Coldfront. In Fall 2016, the band went on tour with The Wonder Years, Real Friends, Knuckle Puck, and Moose Blood.

In October 2016, Seaway announced plans to headline a tour in the United Kingdom for early 2017. In March and April 2017, Seaway supported Simple Plan on the No Pads, No Helmets... Just Balls anniversary tour through Canada and the United States. Prior to the tour, the band had announced a return to the studio for pre-production on their next album. The group announced the completion of LP3 on May 21.

On June 1, 2017 it was announced that Seaway would be a part of the Fearless Records Punk Goes... series on the seventh instalment in the Punk Goes Pop series. It was also announced the same day that they would be covering The Chainsmokers and singer Halsey's hit single Closer. The cover was released on July 14, 2017 via Fearless Records.

Signing to Dine Alone and Vacation (2017–2019) 
On July 13, 2017, it was reported that Seaway had signed to Dine Alone Records to handle the Canadian distribution for their next LP Vacation. Album artwork, track listing and a music video for the first single "Apartment" was also released at this time. The band released a second single, "Something Wonderful" in August, while the band was on tour with With Confidence in Australia.

Vacation was released on September 14, 2017 to positive reviews. Alternative Press (magazine) wrote that Seaway "levelled up in the pop-punk world" and that the album contained "tracks so damn catchy you’ll be singing along upon first listen" giving the album 4.5/5 stars. Andy Biddulph from Rock Sound gave the album 8/10, saying "this is the moment Seaway become real contenders, but more than that, it might just be the pop-punk album of the year." The album was listed as #12 in the magazine's Top 50 releases of 2017, given the review- "with ‘Vacation’ [Seaway] forged absolute pop-punk perfection. Featuring songs about falling in love, dealing with heartbreak and taking your dog for a walk on the beach, the band combined their passions for heart, positivity and boyband peppiness to make an album that is brimming with youthful innocence, and, more than anything, timeless songwriting. We’ll vacation here for many summers to come."

From September to October 2017, Seaway joined Four Year Strong on their Rise or Die Trying anniversary tour through the United States. In November 2017, the band toured through Canada with fellow Oakville natives Silverstein (band). Seaway headlined their "Japanese Vacation" tour in December 2017 through Tokyo, Osaka, and Nagoya. The band headlined a sold-out Toronto "Holiday Shaker" in December 2017 with support from acts Like Pacific and others. In early 2018, Seaway headlined the U.K. with support from British band Woes and Pure Noise roster member Lizzy Farrall. On January 8, the band released a video for their single "London." The video was shot on location in London and Mont Tremblant Resort.

Seaway joined with Neck Deep on The Peace and the Panic USA Tour in late January to February 2018. In May 2018, Seaway supported Sum 41 on the Does This Look Infected? anniversary tour. In the summer of 2018, Seaway headlined a cross-Canada tour with support from Like Pacific, Bearings, and Living with Lions. On the festival route, Seaway played Festivoix in Trois-Rivières in June 2018, 77 Fest in Montreal, Big Slam in Calgary and a Weezer cover set at Stranded Fest in Toronto in August 2018.

On June 1, 2018, tickets went on sale for Seaway's Fall European tour with fellow Pure Noise label-mates State Champs. One week later, Seaway released an acoustic version of their song, Lula on the Beach. On July 30, 2018, it was announced that Seaway would be supporting Blink 182 at The Colosseum at Caesar's Casino in Windsor, Ontario. On March 14, 2019, a rarities compilation Fresh Produce was announced for release on April 19.

Style
Matt Collar of AllMusic described the band as making "exuberant punk-pop and emo-rock" music. Rock Sound described the band's sound as "Fast and classically melodic pop-punk" combined with a "distinct and unashamed pop sensibility."

Side projects
Locke, Taylor and Eichinger play in the hardcore punk band Rage Brigade. They released the F.I.G.H.T.M.U.S.I.C. EP and singles "Slipping Away" & "Hard Love" in 2011.

Accolades
Colour Blind was included at number 32 on Rock Sounds top 50 releases of 2015 list.

Seaway was included in Alternative Press' 14 Most Anticipated Albums for 2017.

Seaway's third full-length album Vacation was listed at number 12 of Rock Sound's top 50 releases of 2017.

Members
Current members
 Ryan Locke – lead vocals (2011–present)
 Andrew Eichinger – guitar, backing vocals (2011–present)
 Adam Shoji – bass guitar (2011–present)
 Ken Taylor – drums, percussion (2011–present)
Former member
 Patrick Carleton – rhythm guitar, vocals (2011–2020)

Discography

Studio albums

Compilation albums

Extended plays

Singles

Other appearances

References
 Citations

Sources

External links
 
 

Musical groups established in 2011
Canadian pop punk groups
Musical groups from the Regional Municipality of Halton
Pure Noise Records artists
2011 establishments in Ontario